Kalashem-e Pain (also Romanized as Kalāshem-e Pā’īn; also known as Kal Hāshem) is a village in Tulem Rural District, Tulem District, Sowme'eh Sara County, Gilan Province, Iran. At the 2006 census, its population was 807, in 215 families.

References 

Populated places in Sowme'eh Sara County